Ndinoimba is Ngonie's first studio album. Released in 2002, it was recorded at ThatSquad Studios by Tatenda "Take 5" Jenami and Sipho "TBA" Mkuhlane (who now calls himself "PlayBoy". The album has 10 "original" tracks, 1 remix track and a 1'13" interlude.

Track listing
 Bvuma (4.18)
 Ndapererwa (4.43) features Raps' Finest
 Ndiwe Chete (5.01)
 Donna (4.22)
 Tell Me Why (3.45) features Kevin from Trinity as Rastah Kev
 Ndinochema (4.56)
 C'mon now (1.13) an interlude
 Wakaenda (5.14)
 Tamba (5.10)
 Happy Birthday (3.42) featuring Gumiso
 Wabata moyo wangu (4.27) written by Janet
 Ndinotenda (4.45)
 Wakaenda (5.07) - Stardust Mixx

Chart performance

Wakaenda spent over six weeks on the then 3FM top 20 charts and then culminated the year at number 2 on the top 100 charts for the year 2002 which was broadcast on 3FM on 2 January 2003. Ndiwe Chete, Bvuma and Happy Birthday were also in the top 100 chart on that same day.

Album sales

Record Labels and/or music distribution companies in Zimbabwe do not release details of the sales of their artistes and so it is difficult to tell the extent to which the album was sold. However, the Zimbabwean Herald Newspaper publishes a weekly poll of the sales performance for each of the main music companies in that country. According to some of these reports, sales of this album were quite good for a number of weeks at least.

Music videos

Only one video was produced for the track Bvuma. The video briefly changes into the song Ndiwe Chete before returning to its title track.

References

 The Daily Mirror -Kambarami coming out of the cold 

Ngonie albums
2002 debut albums
Shona-language albums